ACCUS may refer to:

American Catholic Church in the United States
Automobile Competition Committee for the United States